The Michael Okpara University of Agriculture, originally the Federal University of Agriculture, is a federal university in Umudike, Abia State, Nigeria was established as a specialized University by a Federal Government of Nigeria Decree No 48 of November 1992. It began formal activities in May 1993 with the appointment of the first Council and Vice-Chancellor Professor Placid C. Njoku on 27 May 1993, while other key officials of the University were appointed later.

The first set of students were admitted into the institution during the 1993/94 academic year with a student population of 82.

The nickname "Umudykes" or "U'dykers" is used for students, alumni, and sports teams of the university.

Vice-Chancellor Professor Maduebibisi Ofo Iwe has hinted that the university will start engaging in commercial farming to support its internal generated revenues and better prepare the students for a complex and unpredictable future.

Administration and Vice Chancellors
The Organizational Structure of the institution includes: 
Principal Officers,
Statutory Committees of the University Council,
Congregation, and 
Convocation.

Principal officers
 The Principal Officers which consist of the Chancellor, Pro-Chancellor and the council, Vice Chancellor, Deputy Vice Chancellors (Academic and Administration), the Registrar, the Bursar, and the University Librarian.

Statutory committees of the university council
This committee consists of the following:
The Pro-Chancellor, who serves as the Chairman of the Committee at any meeting at which he is present
The Vice-Chancellor and Deputy Vice-Chancellor(s)
Six other members of the Council appointed by the Council, two of whom are selected from among the three members of the Council appointed by the Senate and one member to the Council by congregation.
The Director-General of the Federal Ministry of Education or, in his absence, a member of his Ministry as he may designate to represent him.

The congregation

The congregation of the university consists of:
The Vice-Chancellor and the Deputy Vice-Chancellor(s)
Full-time members of academic staff
The Registrar                                                                                                                                                                       
The Bursar
The Librarian 
The Director of Works
The Director of Physical Planning
The Director of Academic Planning
The Director of Health Services; and
Every member of the administrative staff who holds a degree other than an honorary degree of any University recognized for the purposes of this statute by the Vice-Chancellor.

The Congregation is entitled to express by resolution or otherwise its opinion on all matters affecting the interest and welfare of the University and shall have such other functions in addition to the function of electing a member of the Council as may be provided by statute or regulation.

Vice chancellors
Several vice chancellors have served the school for a non-renewable period of five years. 

 Professor Placid Njoku (1993 – 1999)
 Professor Ogbonnai Onwudike (January 2000 – February 2006)
 Professor Ikenna Onyido (March 2006 – February 2011)
 Professor Hillary O. Edeoga (March 2011 – February 2016)
 Professor Francis Otunta (March 1st 2016 – March 2021)
Professor Mmaduebisi Ofo Iwe (March 2021 – )

Campus
The institution is located in the Agricultural Training and Research city of Umudike, about 10 kilometers from Umuahia (capital of Abia State). The major link road to the University is the Umuahia-Ikot Ekpene Federal Road, a direct route to the State capitals of Abia, Akwa-Ibom and Cross River States. 
Being close to Umuahia, the University is linked through a major North-South Express Road to most part of the country. It commenced its activities on the premises of the former Federal College of Agriculture, Umudike which is currently located in Ishiagu, Ivo LGA of Ebonyi State and still goes by the name Federal College of Agriculture, Ishiagu.

Colleges and departments
There are eleven colleges and a School of General Studies with fifty-seven departments.

The School of General Studies consists of the following departments: English, French, German, History, Peace and Conflict, Philosophy, Physical and Health, and Social science.

Library 
In 1994, the Institution Library was established with the goal of supporting academic activities at the university, including teaching and learning, research, and community service. The Federal College of Agriculture, Umudike, and the library initially shared space, housing, and library resources until the latter moved to Ishiagu, Ebonyi State, in 1995. 

Two main facilities serve as the university library. The second university library building is known as the library annex, and the university library moved into it in 2011. The main university library building is situated in library phase one, and it was occupied in 2013. There are ten departments and two divisions in the university library. In order to foster community-based library services, the university library also runs a collegiate system with branch libraries in the institution's eleven colleges (taking library services to the faculty and students at their various colleges and departments). This also complies with the rules and conditions set forth by the National Universities Commission (NUC). There is a PG School library in addition to college libraries. The university library has supported the creation of departmental libraries in several university departments by offering information resources, personnel, and other infrastructural resources to support effective library services in such departments.

Academic activities 
The university library participates in a variety of activities to assist the achievement of excellence in university academic programs. In order to accomplish the mission of the university, all divisions of the university library, as well as the college and departmental libraries, are involved in providing vital services. Unbiased book acquisition, library orientation to the new intake, processing of the books for easy accessibility, Selective dissemination of information (SDI), Current awareness services (CAS), Exhibition and display of information resources on topical issues, Inter-library cooperation, and providing reference and referral services are just a few of the services offered.

Departments 
Ten departments make up the University Library, which is housed in library phase one and the Library Annex.  Library phase one is a one-story building comprising the following departments:

 Circulation Department
 Indexing and Documentation
 Administrative Department
 Institutional Repository
 Serials Department
 Information and Communication Technology (ICT) Department

The library Annex houses the following departments:

 The Reference Department
 The Cataloguing and Classification Department
 Acquisition Department
 Bindery Department

Services 

 Loan (Books) services
 Reference and Information service
 Current Awareness service
 Indexing/Abstracting services
 Documentation services
 Bindery and Reprographic services
 Inter-library loan services
 Document Delivery service
 Scholarly database search and retrieval
 Book reservation services
 Library Orientation
 Writers Resort
 Wireless Hotspot

References

External links 
 

 
Education in Abia State
Educational institutions established in 1992
1992 establishments in Nigeria
Federal universities of Nigeria
Agricultural universities and colleges in Nigeria